Oxyporhamphus micropterus is a species of halfbeak found in the tropical oceans.  Some sources elevate the two subspecies to species rank. Others classify it in the monotypic genus Oxyporhamphus. This taxon is found in the Indo-Pacific region where it is a pelagic, oceanodromous species. It was described by Achille Valenciennes as Exocoetus micropterus in 1847, with the type locality of King George Sound, Western Australia.

References

micropterus

Fish described in 1847